Mumtaz Shanti (28 May 1926 – 19 October 1994) was a popular actress in Indian and Pakistani Cinema during 1940s and 1950s. She was known as The Jubilee Girl because of her roles in films Basant and Kismet. She worked in films including Mangti (1942), Basant (1942), Badalti Duniya (1943), Kismet (1943), Dharti Ke Lal (1946), Ghar Ki Izzat (1948) and Aahuti (1950).

Early life
Mumtaz was born in 1926 in Dinga, in the Gujrat District of the Punjab Province of British India into a Punjabi Muslim family. Mumtaz's mother died when she was very young and her aunt took care of her. Mumtaz's uncle encouraged her to learn singing and dancing when she was visiting Lahore Wali Sahib spotted her and then she went to Calcutta and worked in Sohni Kumharan in 1937.

Career

Mumtaz Shanti's career peaked in the 1940s and early 1950s with hit movies like Basant (1942), Kismet (1943), and Ghar Ki Izzat (1948) with a young Dilip Kumar.

Kismet was the biggest hit of her career. The film starring her and Ashok Kumar broke all previous records when it came to box office revenues. It ran for a record three years at Kolkata’s Roxy cinema. This record was broken 32 years later by Sholay.

Personal life
Mumtaz Shanti was married to Wali Mohammad a film director and writer in pre-partition Bollywood then after partition they both moved to Pakistan in the early 1950s and Wali Sahib died of heart failure in 1977.

Death
Mumtaz Shanti died in Pakistan on 19 October 1994.

Filmography

Film

References

External links 
 
 

1926 births
20th-century Indian actresses
Indian film actresses
20th-century Pakistani actresses
Actresses from Lahore
Actresses in Urdu cinema
1994 deaths
Actresses in Hindi cinema
Pakistani film actresses
Actresses in Punjabi cinema